Jacques Guiaud (17 May 1810, Chambéry - 24 April 1876, Paris) was a French painter and engraver; known for landscapes, cityscapes, historical scenes and assorted watercolors.

Biography 
His family was originally from Marseille. , his father, was an actor with the Sociétaires of the Comédie-Française. His mother, Marie-Louise-Victoire de Brecq was an artist. He was born in Chambéry while they were on a business trip.

His first art lessons were with Louis Étienne Watelet and Léon Cogniet. He was also influenced by the landscape painter, Jules Dupré. In 1834, he obtained his first major commission: seven tableaux of historical scenes to decorate the Empire Rooms at the Château de Versailles. King Louis-Philippe I bought his painting "The Pas-Bayard at Dinant". He held an exhibit at almost every Salon from 1831 until his death; winning several awards.

He made numerous trips, including a major one to Italy in 1836. After settling in Nice in 1847, where he gave drawing lessons, he travelled to Switzerland, Belgium, Germany, Denmark and along the Manche (English Channel). Many of his works were created for wealthy foreigners who came to vacation on the Côte d'Azur; such as Princess Sophie of Sweden.

In 1860, he and his family moved to Paris. Five years later, he was among several artists chosen to decorate the Château de Fontainebleau; for which he produced some forested landscapes. he continued to travel; adding Spain and Mallorca to his list of places visited. During this period, he also produced engravings for several magazines, including Le Tour du Monde, the Journal des Artistes and L'Illustration.

His works may be seen in museums throughout France; notably the Musée Carnavalet, which has seven of his paintings with scenes from the Siege of Paris.

Selected paintings

References

Further reading 
 Biography by Lucien Mari @ Nice Historique
 Jacques Guiaud peintre d'histoire, paysagiste, aquarelliste du pays niçois, exhibition catalog, 450 pages, édition Academia Nissarda, 2018

External links 

More works by Guiaud @ ArtNet
Works by Guiaud @ the Base Joconde

1810 births
1876 deaths
19th-century French painters
French landscape painters
French history painters
People from Chambéry
French illustrators